Médard Makanga (born 8 May 1967) is a Congolese sprinter. He competed in the men's 200 metres at the 1992 Summer Olympics.

References

1967 births
Living people
Athletes (track and field) at the 1992 Summer Olympics
Republic of the Congo male sprinters
Olympic athletes of the Republic of the Congo
Place of birth missing (living people)